Don Drumm (born in Westfield, Massachusetts) is an American country music singer.

Drumm began his musical career at 15 years old as a Piano player at Geno's Brass Rail Restaurant. He recorded for Chart and Churchill Records, and entered the Hot Country Songs charts four times. Two of his singles, "Bedroom Eyes" and "Just Another Rhinestone", made top 20 & Top 40. Both hits, written by Ray Hillburn, were also the first chart entries for the Churchill label. He released one album, also titled Bedroom Eyes.

Discography

Albums

Singles

References

American country singer-songwriters
American male singer-songwriters
People from Westfield, Massachusetts
Singer-songwriters from Massachusetts
20th-century American singers
Living people
20th-century American male singers
Year of birth missing (living people)
Country musicians from Massachusetts